AstroGrid was a £7.7M project which built a data-grid for UK astronomy, forming part of the UK contribution to the International Virtual Observatory.  AstroGrid announced its first full production release on 1 April 2008.

The project ran, in three phases, from 2001 to 2009.  Accounts of its end-days suggest that many in the community regretted its early closing.

References

External links
http://www.astrogrid.org
http://www.stfc.ac.uk/

Astronomy in the United Kingdom
College and university associations and consortia in the United Kingdom
Grid computing projects
Information technology organisations based in the United Kingdom
Science and Technology Facilities Council
University of Edinburgh
Virtual observatories